Harry Potter and the Deathly Hallows – Part 1 is a 2010 fantasy film directed by David Yates from a screenplay by Steve Kloves. The film is the first of two cinematic parts based on the 2007 novel Harry Potter and the Deathly Hallows by J. K. Rowling. It is the sequel to Harry Potter and the Half-Blood Prince (2009) and the seventh instalment in the Harry Potter film series.

The film stars Daniel Radcliffe as Harry Potter, with Rupert Grint and Emma Watson, respectively, reprising roles as Harry's best friends Ron Weasley and Hermione Granger. The story follows Harry Potter, who has been asked by Dumbledore to find and destroy Lord Voldemort's secret to immortality – the Horcruxes.

It was released in 2D cinemas and IMAX formats in the United Kingdom and in the United States on 19 November 2010, by Warner Bros. Pictures. The film received positive reviews with critics praising its performances, cinematography, visual effects and musical score.

In the film's worldwide opening weekend, Part 1 grossed $330 million, the third-highest in the series, and the highest opening of 2010, as well as the eighth-highest of all time. With a worldwide gross of $977 million, Part 1 became the third-highest-grossing film of 2010, and the third-highest-grossing Harry Potter film in terms of worldwide totals. The film was nominated for many awards, including the Academy Award for Best Art Direction and Best Visual Effects.

The film was followed by the concluding entry, Harry Potter and the Deathly Hallows – Part 2 in 2011.

Plot
At Malfoy Manor, Severus Snape meets with Lord Voldemort and his Death Eaters. He reports that the Order of the Phoenix will move Harry Potter, no longer under his mother's protective spell, to a safe location. Voldemort confiscates Lucius Malfoy's wand; his own is powerless against Harry because it and Harry's wand are "brothers" by sharing the same phoenix feather core. During the move, Harry survives Voldemort's attack but Mad-Eye Moody and Hedwig are killed.

During preparations for Bill Weasley and Fleur Delacour's wedding, the new Minister for Magic arrives. He informs Harry, Ron, and Hermione that Albus Dumbledore left each a bequest: Ron a Deluminator, Hermione a copy of The Tales of Beedle the Bard, and Harry the Golden Snitch he caught in his first Quidditch match. Dumbledore had also bequeathed the Sword of Gryffindor to Harry, but it has gone missing.

News arrives during the wedding that the Ministry has fallen and the Minister is dead. Death Eaters attack and Harry, Ron, and Hermione escape to Number 12, Grimmauld Place. While there, Ron realizes that Sirius' brother, Regulus Black, is the R.A.B. who stole Salazar Slytherin's locket from Voldemort. Local thief Mundungus Fletcher later sold it to Dolores Umbridge. Harry, Ron and Hermione infiltrate the Ministry and recover the locket but they are chased by Death Eaters in a chaotic exit. Hermione disapparates them to a forest. Meanwhile, Ron is injured. The trio decide to start their journey to discover and destroy all of Lord Voldemort's Horcruxes, starting from the locket.

Attempts to destroy the locket fail. Hermione deduces that Gryffindor's sword can destroy Horcruxes because it is impregnated with basilisk venom. Ron, affected by the dark locket, is frustrated with their slow progress and irrationally jealous of Harry and Hermione. He argues with Harry, then disapparates, leaving Harry and Hermione to continue their journey. When Harry touches the Snitch to his lips, it reveals a cryptic message: "I open at the close." Hermione notices a strange symbol drawn in Beedle the Bard that is identical to one Luna Lovegood's father Xenophilius wears.

Harry and Hermione search for the sword in Godric's Hollow and encounter the same strange symbol in a cemetery. Elderly historian Bathilda Bagshot invites them in her cottage, where they find a photo of the young man in Harry's dream who stole a wand from wandmaker Gregorovitch. Bathilda morphs into Voldemort's snake Nagini and attacks Harry. Hermione disapparates them to safety, but her rebounding spell accidentally destroys Harry's wand. Hermione identifies the man in the photo as dark wizard Gellert Grindelwald. That night, a doe patronus leads Harry to a frozen pond where Gryffindor's sword lies on the bottom. Harry dives into the frigid water, but the locket around his neck tightens, strangling him. Ron appears, retrieves the sword, and saves Harry. They destroy the locket Horcrux with the sword. Ron explains that the Deluminator led him to their location.

Harry, Ron and Hermione visits Xenophilius Lovegood and learn the symbol represents the Deathly Hallows. Many years before, three brothers each received a prize that evades Death: the Resurrection Stone, the Cloak of Invisibility, and the Elder Wand, the most powerful wand known. Possessing all three makes one the Master of Death. Xenophilius secretly summons the Death Eaters, hoping to exchange Harry for a kidnapped Luna. The three escape, but Snatchers capture them. During a vision, Harry sees an elderly Grindelwald telling Voldemort that the Elder Wand is buried with Dumbledore.

At Malfoy Manor, Bellatrix Lestrange sees a Snatcher has Gryffindor's sword that she believed was in her Gringotts vault. Harry and Ron are locked into the cellar where they encounter Luna, Ollivander, and Griphook. Upstairs, Bellatrix tortures Hermione. Harry begs for help using a mirror shard in which he believes he glimpsed Dumbledore; Dobby appears in response and helps save everyone while Harry grabs their captured wands from Draco Malfoy. As they disapparate, Bellatrix throws a knife, killing Dobby. Harry buries him near Bill and Fleur's seaside cottage, an Order safe house. Meanwhile, Voldemort retrieves the Elder Wand from Dumbledore's tomb.

Cast

 Daniel Radcliffe as Harry Potter: A 17-year-old British wizard.
 Rupert Grint as Ron Weasley: A young wizard and one of Harry's best friends and ally.
 Emma Watson as Hermione Granger: A young witch and one of Harry's closest friends and ally.
 Bonnie Wright as Ginny Weasley: Ron's younger sister and Harry's love interest.
 Helena Bonham Carter as Bellatrix Lestrange: A Death Eater, Sirius Black's insane cousin and murderer, and the aunt of Draco.
 Robbie Coltrane as Rubeus Hagrid: Harry's half-giant friend, and gamekeeper at Hogwarts.
 Warwick Davis as Griphook: A goblin and former employee at Gringotts Bank. Davis replaced Verne Troyer, who portrayed the character physically in the first film, though Davis had dubbed Griphook's lines.
 Tom Felton as Draco Malfoy: a Death Eater and son of Lucius and Narcissa Malfoy.
 Ralph Fiennes as Lord Voldemort: An evil power-hungry wizard, and the leader of the Death Eaters.
 Michael Gambon as Professor Albus Dumbledore: Former headmaster of Hogwarts killed by Severus Snape in the previous film.
 Brendan Gleeson as Alastor 'Mad-Eye' Moody: A member of the Order of the Phoenix.
 John Hurt as Garrick Ollivander: A wandmaker abducted by the Death Eaters.
 Rhys Ifans as Xenophilius Lovegood: The eccentric father of the trio's friend Luna.
 Jason Isaacs as Lucius Malfoy: Draco Malfoy's father and a disgraced Death Eater.
 Helen McCrory as Narcissa Malfoy: Draco's mother and Bellatrix's sister.
 Bill Nighy as Rufus Scrimgeour: The new Minister for Magic.
 Alan Rickman as Professor Severus Snape: A double agent to the Death Eaters and the new headmaster of Hogwarts.
 Jim Broadbent as Professor Horace Slughorn: The new Potions teacher at Hogwarts, who has secret knowledge regarding Lord Voldemort.
 Timothy Spall as Peter Pettigrew/Wormtail: The Death Eater who betrayed Harry's parents to Voldemort.
 Imelda Staunton as Dolores Umbridge: Senior Undersecretary to the Minister for Magic and Head of the Muggle-born Registration Commission.
 David Thewlis as Remus Lupin: A member of the Order of the Phoenix and a former teacher at Hogwarts.
 Natalia Tena as Nymphadora Tonks: Remus Lupin's wife and a member of the Order of the Phoenix.
 George Harris as Kingsley Shacklebolt: Another member of the Order of the Phoenix.
 Julie Walters as Molly Weasley: The Weasley matriarch and a mother figure to Harry.
 Mark Williams as Arthur Weasley: Ron Weasley's father, an Auror at the Ministry of Magic.
 Domhnall Gleeson as Bill Weasley: Arthur and Molly's eldest son who helps Harry to escape from Little Whinging and who is to marry Fleur.
 Clémence Poésy as Fleur Delacour: A French Witch of the Beauxbatons School who also helps Harry to escape from Little Whinging.
 Guy Henry as Pius Thicknesse: The puppet Minister of Magic installed by Voldemort.
 Peter Mullan as Corban Yaxley: A Death Eater at the Ministry of Magic.
 Carolyn Pickles as Charity Burbage: The Muggle Studies teacher at Hogwarts, tortured and killed by Voldemort.
 David Ryall as Elphias Doge: An old schoolfriend of Albus Dumbledore who defends him in an obituary.
 Richard Griffiths as Vernon Dursley: Harry's Muggle uncle.
 Fiona Shaw as Petunia Dursley: Harry's Muggle aunt.
 Hazel Douglas as Nagini: Voldemort's familiar snake, who puppeteers the corpse of Bathilda Bagshot.

Production

Part 1 was filmed back-to-back with Harry Potter and the Deathly Hallows – Part 2 from 19 February 2009 to 12 June 2010. Director David Yates, who shot the film alongside director of photography Eduardo Serra, described Part 1 as "quite real"; a "road movie" that's "almost like a vérité documentary".

Originally set for a single theatrical release, the idea to split the book into two parts was suggested by executive producer Lionel Wigram due to what David Heyman called "creative imperative". Heyman initially responded negatively to the idea, but Wigram asked, "No, David. How are we going to do it?". After rereading the book and discussing it with screenwriter Steve Kloves, he agreed with the division.

The production filmed at the Dartford Crossing for the dramatic chase where Harry and Hagrid are being ambushed by Death Eaters.

Sets
Stuart Craig, set designer for all of the previous Harry Potter films, returned for the final two parts. He said, "We made a very different kind of film, which was shot a great deal on location. We travelled quite far, we built sets, and they spend a lot of time in a forest," he explained. "We built forest sets and integrated them into the real forests, so there were challenges there, as you might imagine." Craig was ultimately nominated for an Academy Award for his work on Part 1.

On the wedding tent for Bill and Fleur's wedding in Part 1, Craig commented on his aim to "rather than make it an extension of the house, which is rather eccentric, homemade, we decided to make it rather elegant . . . It's lined with silk and beautiful, floating candelabra. So it's a nice contrast with the house." For the Ministry of Magic set, he noted, "This is an underground world; this is a ministry, so we went to the real ministries, the Muggle ministries – Whitehall, in London – and decided that our magical ministry was kind of a parallel universe to these real ministries."

Craig also commented on his design of Malfoy Manor, saying that it is "a very strong architectural set. The exterior is based on an Elizabethan house here in this country called Hardwick Hall and it has massive windows, and these windows are kind of blinded out. The shutters are drawn so they are like blind windows and they have a real kind of presence, an ominous presence, so that gave us the basis for a good exterior. There's an extraordinary magical roof that's added and surrounded by forest which isn't there in reality, but again is one of the devices to make it more threatening and mysterious."

Costumes
The costumes for Part 1 were designed by Jany Temime, who has been the costume designer on Harry Potter productions since Harry Potter and the Prisoner of Azkaban (2004). Temime was involved in a controversy regarding her work on Fleur Delacour's wedding dress. She was accused of copying the design from a similar dress from Alexander McQueen's Fall 2008 collection. Temime spoke about the dress, saying that she "wanted it to be a witch wedding dress but not a Halloween dress. The dress is white but it needed to have something fantastic to it. So there is the phoenix [motif], the bird, which is a symbol of love in a way because there is rebirth, love never dies, it is born again."

Visual effects

After working on every film since Prisoner of Azkaban, Double Negative was asked to provide visual effects for the final instalments of the story, in Harry Potter and the Deathly Hallows – Parts 1 and 2. Working closely with the film's VFX Supervisor, Tim Burke, the team was led by VFX Supervisor, David Vickery and VFX Producer Charlotte Loughlane. The main team also included 3D Supervisor, Rick Leary and 2D Supervisor, Sean Stranks.

Double Negative's work for Part 1 included the corroding Warner Brothers logo and extensive environment extensions of the Burrows and its surrounds. Additional environment work was completed on Xenophilius Lovegood's home, extending it in 3D and culminating in the Death Eaters' attack. Double Negative also advanced the Death Eaters' smoke effects, with the introduction of the 'flayed man' stage in between their smokey, fluid, flying state and their live-action presence upon landing. Other work included the Patronus charm that interrupts the wedding party to inform the guests that Voldemort has taken over the Ministry of Magic.

The visual-effects company Framestore produced most of the creature CGI, as in previous films, as well as the animated Tale of the Three Brothers sequence, which was directed and designed by Ben Hibon.

Music

Composer Nicholas Hooper, who scored Order of the Phoenix and Half-Blood Prince, did not return for Deathly Hallows. Instead, Alexandre Desplat was hired to compose the score for Harry Potter and the Deathly Hallows – Part 1. The film also featured the song "O Children" by Nick Cave and the Bad Seeds.

Marketing
At the 2010 ShoWest convention, Alan F. Horn premiered unfinished footage from both films. The 2010 MTV Movie Awards premiered more footage from Deathly Hallows. Following this was the release of the official teaser poster, which shows the release date of both Part 1 and Part 2 and a destroyed Hogwarts castle. ABC Family broadcast interviews and additional scenes from both parts during their Harry Potter weekend, which began on 8 July 2010. A two-minute trailer for the film was released worldwide on 22 September 2010.

On 29 September 2010, three character posters for Part 1 of Harry, Ron, and Hermione were released by Yahoo! Movies. The following day, a Part 1 cinema poster was released featuring the trio on the run in a forest. The theatrical poster has the tagline "Nowhere is safe", and another version with no credits has the tagline "The end begins". Various other character posters for Part 1 were released on 6 October 2010, featuring Harry, Ron, Hermione, Lord Voldemort, Bellatrix Lestrange, Severus Snape and Fenrir Greyback. On 12 October, four new character posters were released. The posters are set to the theme of "Trust no one" and "The hunt begins".

On 15 October 2010, tickets began selling on Fandango for the US release of Part 1, and on 19 October, a 50-second clip featuring never-before-seen footage was aired at the 2010 Scream Awards. On 16 October, the second TV spot was released on Cartoon Network during a premiere of Scooby-Doo! Curse of the Lake Monster. On 25 October 2010, Yahoo! Movies released an exclusive featurette of the film. On 30 October 2010, Entertainment Weekly released two new featurettes titled "Horcruxes" and "The Story", featuring a large amount of never-before-seen footage. On the same day, the Warner Bros. Harry Potter website was updated to reveal twelve miniature clips from the film.

On 3 November 2010, the Los Angeles Times released an extended clip of Harry leaving the Burrow to find the Horcruxes, titled "No One Else Is Going to Die for Me". On 4 November, a new clip was released from the Harry Potter Facebook page, titled "The Seven Potters". Two more clips were released over the next two days, including a scene depicting a café attack and another taking place in Malfoy Manor.

Release

Theatrical
On 26 August 2010, director David Yates, producers David Heyman and David Barron, and with Warner Bros. president Alan F. Horn attended a test screening for Deathly Hallows – Part 1 in Chicago. The unfinished film gained rave reviews from test screeners, some of whom labelled it "amazing and dark" and "the most perfect Harry Potter film". Others expressed that the film faithfully adapted the novel, which led to an inheritance of the "book's own problems".

Warner Bros. Pictures was originally going to release Part 1 of Deathly Hallows in 2D and 3D formats. On 8 October 2010, it was announced that plans for a 3D version of Part 1 had been scrapped. "Warner Bros. Pictures has made the decision to release Harry Potter and the Deathly Hallows – Part 1 in 2D, in both conventional and IMAX cinemas [because] we will not have a completed 3D version of the film within our release date window. Despite everyone's best efforts, we were unable to convert the film in its entirety and meet the highest standards of quality." Part 1 of Deathly Hallows was released on Blu-ray 3D as a Best Buy Exclusive. Part 2 was still released in 2D, 3D, and IMAX formats.

The world premiere for Deathly Hallows – Part 1 was held in Leicester Square in London on 11 November 2010, with fans from across the world turning up – some of whom had camped for days in the square. This was followed by the Belgian premiere on 12 November and the US premiere in New York City on 15 November.

Just 48 hours prior to the official North American launch of Part 1, the first 36 minutes of the film were leaked on the internet. Even before the leak, the film was already the fifth-biggest generator of advance ticket sales in history, after selling out 1,000 cinemas across the United States. Despite widely circulating rumours that the leaked footage was a marketing ploy to generate hype for the movie release date, no screener discs had been created by Warner Bros., and executives called it "a serious breach of copyright violation and theft of Warner Bros. property".

In Australia, the film had its premiere on 13 November at Warner Bros. Movie World, located on the Gold Coast, Queensland. Three hundred people attended the viewing, which was the second official showing in the world, behind the UK premiere. The film premiered in Kuwait on 16 November. In Israel, Estonia, and New Zealand, the film was released on 18 November.

Home media
Harry Potter and the Deathly Hallows – Part 1 was released on a single and double disc DVD and 3-disc Blu-ray combo pack on 11 April 2011 in the UK and on 15 April 2011 in the US.
On 28 January 2011, it was announced by Emma Watson on the Harry Potter UK Facebook page that the page's fans will get to vote for their preferred cover for the Part 1 Blu-ray. The cover with the most votes will be the cover for the disc. Voting started that same day. The DVD and Blu-ray include eight deleted scenes, with the Blu-ray Combo Pack containing an opening scene from Part 2 featuring Harry and Ollivander discussing the Deathly Hallows. Deathly Hallows – Part 1 performed well in DVD sales, selling 7,237,437 DVD units and adding $86,932,256 to the gross revenue of the film, bringing the total to $1,043,331,967.

Reception

Box office
Harry Potter and the Deathly Hallows – Part 1 grossed $24 million in North America during its midnight showing, beating the record for the highest midnight gross of the series, previously held by Half Blood Prince, at $22.2 million. The film also had the third-highest midnight gross of all time, behind The Twilight Saga: Eclipse and The Twilight Saga: New Moon, which grossed $30 million and $26.3 million, respectively. The film broke the record for the highest midnight gross in IMAX, with $1.4 million in box office sales, surpassing Eclipse, which grossed $1 million. All of these records were later topped in 2011 by the film's sequel, Harry Potter and the Deathly Hallows – Part 2.

In North America, the film grossed $61.7 million on its opening day, marking the sixth highest single day gross ever at the time. It became the highest opening day for a Harry Potter film in the series, a record previously held by Half-Blood Prince with $58.2 million, until it was broken by Harry Potter and the Deathly Hallows – Part 2 with $92.1 million. The film grossed a total of $125 million in its opening weekend, marking the largest opening for the franchise, previously held by Goblet of Fire and later topped by its sequel Harry Potter and the Deathly Hallows – Part 2. It also was the second biggest November opening ever at the time, behind The Twilight Saga: New Moon $142.8 million,  the ninth biggest weekend opening for a film of all time at the North American box office, and the second biggest opening weekend for a 2010 film in the United States and Canada behind Iron Man 2s $128.1 million. The film stayed at the top of the box office for two weeks, grossing $75 million over the five-day Thanksgiving weekend, bringing its total to $219.1 million.

In the United Kingdom, Ireland, and Malta, the film broke records for the highest Friday gross (£5.9 million), Saturday gross (£6.6 million), and Sunday gross (£5.7 million). Additionally, the film set the largest single day gross (£6.6 million) and the largest opening three-day gross (£18,319,721), a record previously held by Quantum of Solace, which grossed £15.4 million. , Part 1 has grossed £52,404,464 ($86,020,929), becoming the second highest-grossing 2010 release in the country, behind Toy Story 3 (£73,405,113).

Outside North America, the film grossed an estimated $205 million in its opening weekend, becoming the sixth highest of all time, the highest for a 2010 release, and the second highest for a Harry Potter movie, behind only Half-Blood Prince. Globally, the film grossed $330 million in its opening weekend, ranking seventh on the all-time chart.

It was the highest grossing 2010 film in Indonesia ($6,149,448), Singapore ($4,546,240), Thailand ($4,933,136), Belgium and Luxembourg ($8,944,329), France and the Maghreb region ($51,104,397), Germany ($61,430,098), the Netherlands ($13,790,585), Norway ($7,144,020), Sweden ($11,209,387), and Australia ($41,350,865). In total overseas earnings, it surpassed Philosopher's Stone ($657.2 million) to become the highest grossing Harry Potter film overseas.

Part 1 ended its run with $296.4 million in the United States and Canada, making it the fifth-highest-grossing film of 2010 in these regions, and $680.7 million from other countries around the world, for a worldwide total of $977.1 million, making it the third highest-grossing film of 2010 worldwide behind Toy Story 3 and Alice in Wonderland, as well as the third highest grossing Harry Potter film in the series behind The Deathly Hallows – Part 2 and The Philosopher's Stone.

Critical response
The site's critics consensus reads, "It can't help but feel like the prelude it is, but Deathly Hallows: Part I is a beautifully filmed, emotionally satisfying penultimate installment for the Harry Potter series." On Metacritic, the film has a weighted average score of 65 out of 100, based on 42 critics, indicating "generally favourable reviews". Audiences surveyed by CinemaScore gave the film an average grade of "A" on an A+ to F scale.

The UK's Daily Telegraph also gave the film a positive review, remarking, "For the most part the action romps along, spurred by some impressive special effects," adding, "It's just slightly disappointing that, with the momentum having been established so effectively, we now have to wait until next year to enjoy the rest of the ride." Roger Ebert awarded the first part three out of four stars, praising the cast and calling it "a handsome and sometimes harrowing film . . . completely unintelligible for anyone coming to the series for the first time". Scott Bowles of USA Today called it, "Menacing and meditative, Hallows is arguably the best instalment of the planned eight-film franchise, though audiences who haven't kept up with previous chapters will be hopelessly lost", while Lisa Schwarzbaum of Entertainment Weekly likewise praised the film as "the most cinematically rewarding chapter yet." In a review for the Orlando Sentinel, Roger Moore proclaimed Part I as "Alternately funny and touching, it's the best film in the series, an Empire Strikes Back for these wizards and their wizarding world. And those effects? They're so special you don't notice them." Ramin Setoodeh of Newsweek gave a negative review, writing, "They've taken one of the most enchanting series in contemporary fiction and sucked out all the magic . . . while Rowling's stories are endlessly inventive, Potter onscreen just gives you a headache." Lou Lumenick of The New York Post found the film to be "Beautifully shot but a soulless cash machine... [that] delivers no dramatic payoff, no resolution and not much fun."

Keith Uhlich of Time Out New York named Harry Potter and the Deathly Hallows – Part 1 the seventh-best film of 2010, calling it an "elatingly downbeat blockbuster".

Accolades
Harry Potter and the Deathly Hallows – Part 1 was nominated for Best Art Direction and Best Visual Effects at the 83rd Academy Awards. It is the second film in the Harry Potter film series to be nominated for a Visual Effects Oscar (the previous one being Harry Potter and the Prisoner of Azkaban). The film was long-listed for eight different categories, including Best Cinematography, Production Design, and Original Score, at the 64th BAFTA awards, and ultimately was nominated for Best Special Visual Effects and Make-up.

See also
 List of films split into multiple parts

References

External links

 
 
 
 

2010 fantasy films
2010s fantasy adventure films
2010s road movies
American fantasy adventure films
American sequel films
British fantasy adventure films
British sequel films
Children's fantasy films
Films about coups d'état
Films about totalitarianism
Films directed by David Yates
Films produced by David Barron
Films produced by David Heyman
Films produced by J. K. Rowling
Films scored by Alexandre Desplat
Films set in 1997
Films set in Gloucestershire
Films set in London
Films set in Scotland
Films shot at Pinewood Studios
Films shot in Germany
Films shot in Bavaria
Films shot in Buckinghamshire
Films shot in Hertfordshire
Films shot in London
Films shot in Merseyside
Films shot in North Yorkshire
Films shot in Pembrokeshire
Films shot in Suffolk
Films with screenplays by Steve Kloves
07
Heyday Films films
High fantasy films
IMAX films
Warner Bros. films
2010s English-language films
2010s American films
2010s British films